The Agago District is a Ugandan district located in North east Uganda.

Location
Agago District is bordered by Kitgum District to the north, Kotido District to the northeast, Abim District to the east, Otuke District, to the south, and Pader District to the west. The coordinates of the district are:02 50N, 33 20E.

Overview
Agago District is one of the newest districts in Uganda. It was established by Act of Parliament and began functioning on 1 July 2010. Prior to that date, it was part of Pader District. The district is part of the Acholi sub-region, together with:
1. Amuru District 2. Gulu District 3. Kitgum District 4. Lamwo District 5. Nwoya District and 6. Pader District.

Population
In 1991, the national population census estimated the district population at 100,700. In 2002, the population of Agago District was recorded at approximately 184,000. In 2014, during the national population census and household survey, the population of the district was enumerated at 227,792.

See also

References

External links
  Proposed Agago District Homepage

 
Acholi sub-region
Northern Region, Uganda
Districts of Uganda